Eugenie Breithut-Munk (12 July 1867, Vienna - 21 July 1915, Vienna) was an Austrian painter; specializing in portraits and genre scenes. She also designed bookplates, in the Art Nouveau style.

Biography 
She learned drawing at the "Allgemeinen Zeichenschule für Frauen und Mädchen" (drawing school for women and girls), from the architect, . She then went to Munich, where she enrolled at the Damenakademie (Ladies' Academy), founded by Bertha von Tarnóczy. There, she studied with Ludwig Schmid-Reutte. 

A scholarship grant enabled her to make study trips to Paris and London. In 1892, she had her first exhibit, in Paris, at the "Exposition des arts de la femme". She returned to Vienna in 1900. Shortly after, she married the painter and sculptor, .

The other original members were Olga Wisinger-Florian (who began the organizing process), Marie Egner, Marianne von Eschenburg, Marie Müller, Teresa Feoderovna Ries, and Bertha von Tarnóczy. In 1906, they were represented at an exhibition in Earl's Court, London. 

In 1908, she took part in the "Kunstschau am Heumarkt", with Gustav Klimt as the event's President. She also participated in several exhibitions at the Vienna Künstlerhaus, and with the Vienna Secession at the Secession Building.

References

Further reading 
 Marianne Baumgärtner: Der Verein der Schriftstellerinnen und Künstlerinnen in Wien (1885–1938). Böhlau, 2015, pg.338

External links 

 
 Entry on Breithut-Munk in the databank "Frauen in Bewegung 1848–1938" @ the Austrian National Library

1867 births
1915 deaths
Austrian painters
Austrian portrait painters
Austrian women painters
Artists from Vienna